Titan is a game engine developed by Stainless Steel Studios used in the real-time strategy genre. It was mainly used as a PC game engine in the early 2000s. The engine was used in Stainless Steel Studio's early games, such as Empire Earth and Empires: Dawn of the Modern World.

Titan 2.0
Titan 2.0, an update of the original Titan Engine, was to be a comprehensive real-time strategy engine, and was sold before Stainless Steel Studios was dissolved in 2005.

Description
SSSI described their engine on their website (before it shut down) at the day  of its release. They said it would handle all objects in the gaming world, has an integrated scenario editor, a powerful multiplayer mode and communicator, built-in artificial intelligence and 3D graphics. The engine was announced in May 2004, and was designed by SSSI, whose head designer is Rick Goodman, the designer of Empire Earth and Age of Empires. SSSI's last game made using this engine was Rise and Fall: Civilizations at War. Since SSSI has closed, its website, the original Titan website, and any information about Titan 2.0 has for the most part disappeared. Little more is known about the original game processor, other than that it was used in some of the Empire series, such as Empire Earth.

Price and purchasing
After its press release, the engine was promptly purchased by Tilted Mill Entertainment, a small production company in Massachusetts. The engine was also available for purchase to anyone for US$250,000 at its release.

Games Using Titan 2.0
Immortal Cities: Children of the Nile (November 2004) Tilted Mill Entertainment.
Rise and Fall: Civilizations at War (June 2006) Midway.
Caesar IV (September 2006) Tilted Mill Entertainment.

References

See also
Stainless Steel Studios – Original developers of the Titan engine
Rick Goodman – The lead designer of SSSI.
Tilted Mill Entertainment – The company that purchased Titan 2.0.

2001 software
 
Video game engines